Jordan Prentice (born January 30, 1973) is a Canadian actor. A self-described "person of short stature", he is known for his portrayal of Rock in American Pie Presents: The Naked Mile and Jimmy in In Bruges, and for appearing in the music videos for Vengaboys' "Shalala Lala" and The Bloodhound Gang's "The Bad Touch." He was also one of the actors to play Howard the Duck. He is the lead actor in Toronto Playwright, Eric Woolfe's Revenger's Medicine Show which is currently  in development by Eldritch Theatre.

Prentice developed an interest in acting when he was a child and was a member of the Young Players from the Drama Program, Department of English at the University of Western Ontario. Later he attended École Alexandra, the Module scolaire de langue française at London Central Secondary School and Dalhousie University. He was 13 when he played in Howard the Duck.

Prentice appeared on British television in a series of nine commercials for British radio station Absolute Radio, with DJ Christian O'Connell, as Doug, the station's new music-mad security guard with attitude.

He currently resides in Montreal, Quebec.

Filmography

Film

Television

References

External links

Jordan Prentice at Northernstars.ca

1973 births
Living people
20th-century Canadian male actors
21st-century Canadian male actors
Actors with dwarfism
Canadian male film actors
Canadian male television actors
Male actors from London, Ontario